Adolph Jonathan "Alf" Hanson (27 July 1912 – October 1993) was a football player for Liverpool, Chelsea, South Liverpool, Shelbourne, Ellesmere Port Town and Tranmere Rovers.

Life and playing career

Born Bootle, Lancashire, Hanson played for Bootle before he signed for George Patterson's Liverpool in November 1931, he didn't make his debut until 21 January 1933 in a 1st Division match at Villa Park, in wasn't the most auspicious of debut's for Hanson as Liverpool were humbled by a 5–2 scoreline, Alf scored his first goal 11 days later in his second appearance in a red shirt, the date was the 1 February and it was in a league game at Anfield, Middlesbrough were the visitors and took the spoils with a 3–1 victory.

Hanson took his time making a name for himself at Liverpool but eventually broke into the first team, it took him just 4 games to forever cement his name into Anfield folklore, he scored his first hat-trick, however, it was the opponents for the day that were the reason for his fame, they were derby rivals Everton, the whole game was one to remember for the red half of Liverpool as the Reds won the game 7–4, it was all the more bitter for Everton who had given Alf an outing in an A team fixture but never took up the option of signing him.

Hanson, a ship's plumber by trade, knew where the goal was, considering he was an outside left, scoring a goal every 3.4 matches, not bad when a centre forward is happy if he can score 1 in every 3. He eventually ended up with 52 in 177 appearances in the famous red shirt. Although Alf had an eye for goal he's main talent was the ability to send over pinpoint crosses for one of Liverpool's famous centre forwards Gordon Hodgson.

Alf's brother Stan was the goalkeeper for Bolton Wanderers when the two sides met at Anfield on 23 April 1938, the two brothers were made their teams respective captains with Alf coming out on top in a 2–1 victory for Liverpool with goals in the fourth and seventh minutes from Jack Balmer and Phil Taylor respectively.

A columnist from the Liverpool Echo newspaper once wrote of Hanson "A slip of a lad he was not entirely a one-footed player but it was that left boot which put fear into the hearts of goalkeepers when they saw Alf prancing down the wing."

Alf left Liverpool in the summer of 1938 for the sum of £7,500 although he did 'guest' for Liverpool again in a wartime match. Other clubs he guested for during World War II included Wrexham, Chester, Manchester City, Bolton Wanderers, Crewe Alexandra, Rochdale, Tranmere Rovers and Southport. Hanson eventually entered into management taking on the role of player/manager for South Liverpool, Shelbourne and Ellemere Port Town.

His one season at Shelbourne he finished as joint top scorer in the League of Ireland.

Alf's only England appearance came in a wartime international on 8 February 1941 against Scotland whilst he was contracted to Chelsea, the game was at St James' Park and ended in a 3–2 win to the Scots, Hanson did, however, play regularly for the England baseball team.

Alf Hanson died in 1993 aged 81.

Honours
Individual
 League of Ireland Top Scorer: 1946–47

Career details

 Liverpool F.C (1931–1938) – 177 appearances, 50 goals
 Chelsea F.C (1938–1946) – 45 appearances, 9 goals
 Shelbourne F.C. (1946–1947) – 13 appearances, 11 goals
 England (1941) 1 wartime cap

External links
Official player profile at Liverpoolfc.tv
Player profile at LFChistory.net

References

1912 births
1993 deaths
Sportspeople from Bootle
English footballers
Association football wingers
Liverpool F.C. players
Chelsea F.C. players
Shelbourne F.C. players
Gloucester City A.F.C. players
South Liverpool F.C. players
Ellesmere Port Town F.C. players
English Football League players
League of Ireland players
Liverpool F.C. wartime guest players
Wrexham F.C. wartime guest players
Chester City F.C. wartime guest players
Manchester City F.C. wartime guest players
Bolton Wanderers F.C. wartime guest players
Rochdale A.F.C. wartime guest players
Crewe Alexandra F.C. wartime guest players
Tranmere Rovers F.C. wartime guest players
Southport F.C. wartime guest players
England wartime international footballers
English expatriate footballers
English expatriate sportspeople in Ireland
Expatriate association footballers in the Republic of Ireland
Association football player-managers
English football managers
Shelbourne F.C. managers
Ellesmere Port Town F.C. managers
League of Ireland managers
English expatriate football managers
Expatriate football managers in the Republic of Ireland